Abakar is a Chadian surname. Notable people with the surname include:
 Abanga Abakar (born 1994), Chadian football player
 Mahamat Issa Abakar (born 1984), Chadian football player
 M'Bairo Abakar (born 1961), Chadian judoka
 Oumar Abakar (born 1979), Chadian football player

Surnames of Chadian origin